Edward Haygood Adams (August 17, 1910 – October 22, 1958) was an American football and basketball coach.

Biography
Adams was born on August 17, 1910 in Grambling, Louisiana.  He was the son of Martha and Charles P. Adams, founder and first President of Grambling University.  He attended Tuskegee University.

Adams served as the sixth head football coach at the North Carolina College for Negroes—now known as North Carolina Central University—in Durham, North Carolina and he held that position for the 1936 season, compiling a record of 4–3–1. Adams was also the head basketball coach at North Carolina Central for one season in 1936–37, at Tuskegee University from 1937 to 1949, and at Texas Southern University from 1949 to 1958, amassing a career college basketball coaching record of 464–135.

Adams died of a stroke on October 22, 1958 at St. Elizabeths Hospital in Houston, Texas.

Works
A Comparative Anthropometric Study of Hard Labor during Youth as a Stimulator of Physical Growth of Young Colored Women in Research Quarterly of the American Association for Health and Physical Education

Notes

References

1910 births
1958 deaths
American men's basketball players
North Carolina Central Eagles football coaches
North Carolina Central Eagles men's basketball coaches
Texas Southern Tigers men's basketball coaches
Tuskegee Golden Tigers football players
Tuskegee Golden Tigers men's basketball coaches
Sportspeople from Grambling, Louisiana
African-American coaches of American football
African-American players of American football
African-American basketball coaches
Basketball players from Louisiana
Basketball coaches from Louisiana
Coaches of American football from Louisiana
20th-century African-American sportspeople